George Varghese Koppara (born 23 March 1958) is a physicist from India. He has published considerable amount of International journals based on the topic Crystals and Crystallography. He was also the former Principal of Catholicate College, Pathanamthitta. His interest on Environmental protection has inspired him to write book Jaivam Jeevanam, published by DC Books, Kottayam, Kerala. He has also written a book on latest trend in Nanoscience and Nanomaterials.

Academic life
 Principal, University Institute of Technology, (Kerala University) Mannady, Adoor.  18 Dec 2015 onward 
 Member, Syndicate, M.G.University, Kottayam.  Feb 2010-Jan 2012 (2 years)
 Principal, Catholicate college, Pathanamthitta, April 2010-March 2014 (4 years)
 Bursar, Catholicate college, Pathanamthitta, 2008-10 (2 years)
 Member, Academic council, MG University, Kottayam2010-12
 Member, Senate, M.G.University, Kottayam, 2010–12
 Bursar, Catholicate College, Pathanamthitta, 2008–10
 Member, Board of Studies of Physics, P.G.Level M.G.University
 Member, Board of studies of Environmental Science, Calicut University 
 Chairman, Board of Question Paper setters of M.Sc. Physics, Kannur University
 Chairman, Board of Question Paper setters of M.Sc. Physics Advanced Materials, Kannur University, Kannur
 Chairman, M.Sc. Physics Material Science Board of Examiners, M.G.University, Kottayam
 Editorial Board member, APTunes, Physics Journal 
 Coordinator. ADD-ON Course in Computer technology (UGC sponsored) 
 Addl. Chief supt. of Examination of Distance Education centre in Dubai 2007

Journal publications 
 Determination of optical band gap energy of wurtzite ZnO:Ce nanocrystallite, Physical Science International journal, 5(2), 2015,146-54. Characterisation and optical study on ZnS Nanostructures doped with Gd Ions, Materials Today, Pro, 3, 2016, 282-88 
 Characterisation, Thermal effect on optical band gap energy and Photoluminescence in wurtzite ZnO:Er, Nanocrystallites, Materials today, Pro, 3, 2016, 145-151
 Characterisation and elastic properties of wurtzite ZnO:Ce nano crystallite, Asian Journal of Research in Chemistry,8(3), 2015, 183-189
 Characterisation and elastic study on Zinc Sulphide nano fluid doped with Neodymium ions, American Chemical Science Journal, 5, 2, 2015, 148–155.
 Determination of Optical Band Gap energy of Wurtzite ZnO:Ce Nanocrystalolites, Physical Science International Journal 2015, 59(2), 146-154
 Detection of anomalies in NLO sulphamic acid single crystals by ultrasonic and thermal studies, Bulletin of Material Science, 2015 (In Press)
 Characterisation and optical studies of CuO nanostructures doped with Lanthanum ions, Advances in Material Science, 14, 4(42), 49–60, 2014
 Growth and elastic study on CuO: La nanofluid, The international journal of engineering and sciences, 3, 7, 2014, 9–12.
 Determination of Band Gap Zinc Oxide nanocrystallites doped with Lanthanum ions, International journal of Latest Research in science and Technology, 3, 2, 2014, 133–36.
 Zinc sulphide nanocrystallites doped with rare earth Neodymium ions- An optical study, International journal of Engineering, Science and Innovative Technology, 2014, 3, 4, 206-212
 Ultrasonic investigation of elastic properties in ZnS:Ce nanocrystallites, J.Pure Applied and Industrial Physics, 2014, 4, 3, 133-141 
 Elastic anomalies in Li2Na3(SO4)2 single crystals- An Ultrasonic study, O.J.Acoustics, 2014,4,131-37 
 Measurement of elastic parameters of Lithium Hydroxyl Ammonium sulphate single crystal by Ultrasonic PEO Technique, O. J. Acoustics, 2014, 4, 138-144
 Study of Blue shift of Optical band in Cadmium Sulphide nanoparticles doped with Holmium ions, Asian journal of Research in chemistry, 2014, 7, 10, 846-50
 Variation of Elastic parameters of CdS:Ho nanofluid- An Ultrasonic study, J. Chemical Science Transactions, 3(4), 2014, 1525–29. DOI:10.7598/cst 2014.912
 Optical Studies in ZnS:Ce nanocrystallite, Chemi. Science Transactions, 3(4), 2014, 1354–59.
 Optical band gap energy determination of ZnO:Gd nanostructures, International Journal for Innovative Research in Technology and Science 2, 5, 2014, 43–46.
 Optical Band gap on wurtzite Zinc Sulphide nanocrystallites doped with lanthanum ions, Journal of Advanced Material research, Manufacturing science and technology III, 622–23, 752–57, 2013
 Electrical conductivity and dielectric properties of Potassium Sulphamate single crystals Cryst. Research Tech, 22 Jul 2011 (IF:1.8)
 Conductivity studies in Sulphamic acid single crystal, Crys. Research Tech, 45, 8, 879–882, 2010.
 Detection of phase transition in KNH2SO3 single crystal by temperature variation of elastic constants, Physica B: Condensed matter, 405, 1813–16, 2010. (IF : 1.7)
 Anisotropy in the elastic properties of Lithium sodium sulphate hexahydrate single crystal-An Ultrasonic study, Bulletin of Material Science, 32,5,612-16, 2010. (IF : 1.203)
 Elastic study of Potassium sulphamate crystal using ultrasonic Pulse echo overlap technique, Solid State Commun. 149, 645–47, 2009. (IF : 1.929)
 Elastic constant measurements of super ionic LiKSO4 : Na single crystals-An ultrasonic study J. Crys. Res. Tech., 44, 3, 300–304, 2009. (IF : 1.807)
 Elastic anomalies in LiKSO4:Na single crystal –An ultrasonic study, J Ferroelectrics, 377, 1–8, 2008. (IF : 1.225)
 Phase transition study in Li2Na3(SO4)2.6H2O  single crystal, Journal of Pure and Applied Ultrasonics, 2, 30, 2008. (IF : 0.514)
 Lithium Potassium Hydrogen Sulphate single crystal. an ultrasonic study, J Ferroelectrics, 323, 133–137, 2005.(IF : 1.225)
 Detection of anomalies in superionic  Lithium Sodium Sulphate single crystal-An Ultrasonic study (Commun. to Pramana, J Physics)
 Variation of Crystalline parameters with capping agents and Optical study of CdS Nanoparticles doped with Erbium ions, J Materials Today, 2015 (In Press)
 Growth and characterisation on ZnS:La Nanostructured crystals, Catholicate Journal of Studies and Research, 1,1,2011 p. 110
 Growth and study on the variation of grain size with temperature of ZnO: Ce nanocrystallites, Catholicate Journal of Studies and Research, sp. issue, Synergia, 2, 1, 2014, p. 1-6
 Packing, appropriate to Environment sustainability, Janapadam, A journal of Information and Public relations department, Govt. of Kerala, 41, 7, July, 2009, p. 22-23
 Environment responsive padding for the sustainability of life on earth, Yojana, A journal of Publication division, Govt of India, 37, 9 May 2009, p. 49-50
 Is CFL Lamps hazardous to human life, Vidyaramgam, Journal of Kerala state Public instruction department, June 2009, p. 31-32
 Eco friendly Packing, Vidyarangam, Journal of Kerala state Public instruction department, 34, 11, Nov 2008, p. 15
 Green consumer Packing for the existence of life on earth, in Vijnana Kairali, Journal of Kerala State institute of languages, 39, 10, Oct 2008, p. 69
 Dielectric and conductivity anomaly near 370K in Lithium Hydroxylammonium Sulphate single crystal (Ferroelectric and dielectric-new perspectives, special issue of McMillan Co. Ltd, 2007, p. 213)
 Growth and elastic constants measurements id Li2Na3(SO4)2.6H2O single crystal, Macmillan India Ltd., N.Delhi, 2007, p. 145
 Ozone hole and life on earth, Vidyarangam, Journal of Kerala state Public instruction department,  October 2007, p. 22-23
 Depletion in the layers of life, Aksharakairali magazine, Journal Kerala state literacy mission, September 2007, p. 18-19

Seminar presentations 
 Characterization, Thermal effect on Optical band gap energy and Photoluminescence in wurtzite ZnO:Er Nanocrystallites, Proce. Of International conference on Functional Materials, at Stony brook university, Long Island, New York USA, on 29 June to 3 July 2015
 Variation of Crystalline parameters with capping agents and Optical study of CdS Nanoparticles doped with Erbium ions, Proce. Of International conference on Functional Materials, at Stony brook university, Long Island, New York USA, on 29 June to 3 July 2015
 Characterization and Optical study on Zinc Sulphide nanostructures doped with Gadolinium ions, Proce. Of International conference on Functional Materials, at Stony brook university, Long Island, New York USA, on 29 June to 3 July 2015.
 Temperature dependent AC conductivity and dielectric studies of Nickel selenate hexahydrate single crystal. (Proce. of 3rd International conference on ionic devices ICID2006, held at Anna university, Chennai, on Dec. 7–9, 2006, p. 105)
 Elastic anomalies in the superionic LiK0.9Na0.1SO4 single crystal-An Ultrasonic study (Proce. of 3rd International conference on ionic devices ICID2006, held at Anna university, Chennai, on Dec. 7–9, 2006, p. 109)
 Dielectric and conductivity anomaly near 260K in Potassium sulphamate single crystal (Proce. of 3rd International conference on ionic devices ICID2006, held at Anna university, Chennai, on Dec. 7–9, 2006, p. 103)
 Anisotropy in elastic properties in Potassium Lithium Hydrogen Sulphate (Proce. of the International conference of Ferroelectric and dielectrics, AMF-4,Dec.12-15,2003 at IISc Bangalore p. 47)
 Growth and optical studies in CuO:La Nanomaterials (Proc. of the International seminar on nano structures held in St. Thomas College, Pala on 15–17 June 2012, p. 23)
 Optical Band gap on wurtzite Zinc Sulphide nanocrystallites doped with lanthanum ions (Proce. Of International conference on Nanoscience, naonomaterials, and nanoengineering (ICNNN_2012) held in Singapore on 6-7th Oct 2012 p. 125)

Social life 
General Secretary, State Committee, Kerala Congress (D) 
Member, Managing committee, Malankara Orthodox Syrian church
President, Service Co-operative Bank, Chandanappally
Chairman, District tourism cooperative society, Pathanamthitta

Books
 Jaivam Jeevanam, George Varghese, DC Books, Kottayam, Kerala (2010) 
 Dhikhanashalikal,George Varghese, Catholicate Publications, Pathanamthitta, Kerala, (2012)
 Recent Trends in Nanoscience and Nanomaterials, (Eds): George Varughese(Chief Editor) and Valsamma M Samuel, Catholicate Publications, Kerala,(2012)
 Recent trends in Astrophysics, (Eds): George Varghese(C.E) and MJ Kurien, Catholicate publications, (2012)
 Health education, Yoga and Stress management (Eds): George Varughese ( M.E) and Sosamma John, Catholicate Publications,Pathanamthitta, Kerala,(2011)

References
 http://www.thehindu.com/news/national/kerala/national-seminar-on-biotechnology-begins/article2854213.ece

External links
 http://www.catholicatecollege.com/
 http://orthodoxchurch.tv/2014/02/18/atrocities-at-pathanamthitta-catholicate-college/ 
 http://marthoman.tv/2012_news/april_2012/Fr.%20V.%20C.%20Samuel%20Centenary.pdf
 http://shodhganga.inflibnet.ac.in:8080/jspui/bitstream/10603/19664/5/05_acknowledgement.pdf
 http://www.puzha.com/e-arcade/dcb/catalogue/cateng17.html 
 http://es.knowledger.de/9009735/ColegioDeCatholicatePathanamthitta
 http://agritech.tnau.ac.in/daily_events/2012/english/feb/3_feb_12_eng.pdf
 http://www.myschoolvision.com/news/national-seminar-at-st-cyrils-college.aspx

Living people
1957 births
20th-century Indian chemists
People from Pathanamthitta district
Scientists from Kerala